The men's keirin competition at the 2022 UEC European Track Championships was held on 16 August 2022.

Results

First round
The first rider in each heat qualified to the second round, all other riders advanced to the first round repechages.

Heat 1

Heat 2

Heat 3

Heat 4

Repechage
The first two riders in each heat qualify to the second round.

Heat 1

Heat 2

Heat 3

Heat 4

Second round
The first three riders in each heat qualify to final 1–6, all other riders advance to final 7–12.

Heat 1

Heat 2

Finals

Small final

Final

References

Men's keirin
European Track Championships – Men's keirin